Loafing and Camouflage: Sirens in the Aegean  is a 2005 motion picture and the second to bear the "Loafing & Camo" stamp (the first being Loafing and Camouflage by Nikos Perakis), although in fact it has nothing to do with that production beyond the military environment. The original sequel to Loafing and Camouflage (1984) was the 1987 film "Living Dangerously" by the same director. The film stars an ensemble cast of Greek and Turkish actors. In 2011, the film "Loafing and Camouflage: Sirens at Land" features the reunion of the cast 8 years later.

Plot
This army satire follows a small group of Greek Army soldiers in the island of Kos, when they are assigned to spend a few days guarding a small rock island named Pitta to defend an alleged invasion from Turkish troops. After their arrival in Pitta, everything looked normal until a Turkish boat (sent there for a modeling photo shooting) disembarked 4 castaways on Pitta. Amongst the models was the niece of a Turkish Admiral, which made things more complicated when the Turkish authorities started looking for them. The protagonists did not know what to do since a diplomatic incident could be inevitable. The outcome is the involvement of both countries in the incident resulting in several comic situations.

Reception

Critical response 

The movie received mixed to positive reviews from film critics, with an average score of 6/10 based on 577 reviews.

Box Office 

The movie was a box office success, earning $11,680,950.

Cast
Yannis Tsimitselis	 .... 	Alexandros Tzibitzidis
George Seitaridis	.... 	Charalambis "Chambos" Parlavatzas
Ioannis Papazisis	.... 	Denis Kalouris
Orfeas Avgoustidis	.... 	Minos "Survivor" Stavrakomathiakakis
Socratis Patsikas	.... 	Stefanos Nakos
Stelios Ksanthoudakis	.... 	Manolis Papadakis
Vassilis Haralabopoulos	.... 	Bakakos
Renos Haralambidis	.... 	Xenofon Makris
Vicky Kaya	.... 	Marialena Georgiadou
Tuğçe Kazaz	.... 	Havva
Arzu Yanardağ	.... 	Sevda
Müge Bakırcıoğlu	.... 	Pinar
Metin Belgin	.... 	Osman
Aris Bafaloukas	.... 	Gouvelis
Apostolis Totsikas	.... 	Panos Livadas
Yetkin Dikinciler	.... 	Kenan
Turgay Tanülkü	.... 	Turgut
Nizam Madak	.... 	Helih
Khan Farzana	.... 	Nouri
Ram Satoop	.... 	Haroon
Ahmad Habach	.... 	Cemal

External links

Loafing and Camouflage: Sirens in the Aegean (Producer's website)

2005 films
Greek satirical films
Greek sequel films
2000s Greek-language films
Films directed by Nikos Perakis